The kiss of death or lipstick pistol was a pistol used by the KGB during the Cold War. It was a single shot 4.5 mm pistol hidden inside a lipstick holder.

An example found in West Berlin at an American checkpoint is now held by the International Spy Museum in Washington, D.C., USA.
One is used throughout Metal Gear Solid 3: Snake Eater by EVA.

Notes

KGB
Cold War firearms of the Soviet Union
Single-shot pistols